Eagle Creek is a tributary,  long, of the Powder River in the northeastern part of the U.S. state of Oregon. Beginning at Eagle Lake in the Wallowa Mountains, the creek flows generally southwest and then southeast to meet the river near the small city of Richland. The creek's headwaters are in the Eagle Cap Wilderness within the Wallowa–Whitman National Forest. The upper  of the creek, from Eagle Lake to the national forest boundary at Skull Creek, are part of the National Wild and Scenic Rivers System.

Recreation

Camping and hiking
The Main Eagle Trailhead, adjacent to the creek near its confluence with Boulder Creek, provides access to an extensive system of trails for hiking and horse riding in the wilderness. Amenities include parking, an interpretive site, and a vault toilet.

Along Forest Road 7755 slightly downstream of the Main Eagle Trailhead is the Boulder Park Campground with seven sites for tent or trailer camping. Amenities include picnic tables, a vault toilet, and a loading ramp and bunk feeder for pack and riding animals. Water for the animals is available from the creek.

Near the campground is the Two Color Guard Station, a rental cabin with accommodations for up to 12 people. Amenities include parking, a vault toilet, propane lights, a cook stove and oven, a propane heater, and a horse corral. No smoking or pets are allowed inside the cabin. The site has no water for drinking, cooking, or washing.

Tamarack Campground, near the confluence of Eagle Creek with West Eagle Creek, is along Forest Road 77. It has room for 12 tents or small trailers; amenities include toilets, picnic tables, and drinking water.

Eagle Fork Campground, along Forest Road 7735, is near the confluence of Eagle Creek with Little Eagle Creek. With room for seven tents or trailers, it has amenities including picnic tables, toilets, and drinking water. The campground is adjacent to the Eagle Forks Trailhead, with access to Martin Bridge Trail along the creek.

Fishing
Anglers can reach the lower river by road and the upper river along trails.

Tributaries
Named tributaries of Eagle Creek from source to mouth are Cached Creek and Bench Canyon, then Copper, Boulder, Little Boulder, Two Color, West Eagle, and Skookum creeks, followed by Excelsior Gulch. Then Dixie, Bennet, O'Brien, Bradley, and East Fork Eagle creeks, followed by Blue Canyon and Twilight Gulch.

Further downstream come Paddy Creek and Empire Gulch followed by Basin, Dempsey, Puzzle, and Shanghai creeks. Then Six Dollar Gulch and Holcolmb, Little Eagle, and Trouble creeks, followed by Town Gulch. Then Skull, Barnard, and Summit creeks.

See also
 List of rivers of Oregon

References

External links
Powder Basin Watershed Council

Rivers of Baker County, Oregon
Rivers of Union County, Oregon
Rivers of Oregon
Wild and Scenic Rivers of the United States